Chabet el Ameur is a town and commune in Boumerdès Province, Algeria. According to the 1998 census it has a population of 30,223.

History
 First Battle of the Issers (1837)

Notable people

 Ali Laskri, Algerian politician.

References

Communes of Boumerdès Province